Jeffrey Scott Bittiger (born April 13, 1962) is a former relief pitcher for the Philadelphia Phillies, Minnesota Twins, and Chicago White Sox of Major League Baseball. He pitched four seasons in the major leagues, from  until . He also was listed as a professional scout for the Oakland Athletics, based in Pennsylvania.

Amateur career
Raised in Secaucus, New Jersey, Bittiger played prep baseball at Secaucus High School.

Bittiger attended college at Jersey City State University and Seton Hall University in the off seasons, and was drafted by the New York Mets out of high school in the 7th round of the 1980 draft on June 3.

Professional career

New York Mets system
Thereafter, he languished in the minor leagues until January 16, 1986, when the Mets traded him to the Philadelphia Phillies.

Phillies
Bittiger broke into Major League Baseball as a starter for the Philadelphia Phillies in 1986. He hit a home run off of Bob Kipper of the Pittsburgh Pirates on September 22, 1986, in his second at bat as a player for the Phillies, earning his first career win and getting credit for the game-winning RBI. He started only three games for the Phillies, and had a 5.70 ERA in 14 IP. He played for the Phillies until December 8, 1986, when he was released. He was signed by the Atlanta Braves just 12 days later on December 20, 1986, but was released by that organization April 4, 1987. On April 15, he signed with the Minnesota Twins.

Twins
In 1987, Bittiger pitched infrequently for the Minnesota Twins, first as a starter, then as a middle man. He pitched one inning in the Twins loss to the Kansas City Royals, giving up two hits and one earned run. The Twins went on to beat the Royals and eventually win the World Series in October 1987. The Twins released him after the season on November 12, 1987, and on January 22, 1988, he was signed by the Chicago White Sox.

White Sox
The next year, 1988, Bittiger played for the Chicago White Sox, pitching in a career high 25 games, and starting seven of those. In his seven starts Bittiger went 2–4, and had no decision the other game. His ERA for 1988 was 4.26 in 61 IP. The next year Bittiger pitched in only two major league games, starting one, which he lost. His ERA for the year was 6.85 in 9 IP. After the season, Bittiger was traded to the Los Angeles Dodgers for Tracy Woodson, but he never pitched in the majors again. He continued to pitch in the minor leagues until 1996.

References

External links

Jeff Bittiger at SABR (Baseball BioProject)
Jeff Bittiger at Baseball Almanac
Jeff Bittiger at Baseballbiography.com

1962 births
Living people
Baseball players from Jersey City, New Jersey
People from Secaucus, New Jersey
American expatriate baseball players in Canada
Chicago White Sox players
Little Falls Mets players
Jackson Mets players
Lynchburg Mets players
Tidewater Tides players
Portland Beavers players
Vancouver Canadians players
Gulf Coast White Sox players
Albuquerque Dukes players
Colorado Springs Sky Sox players
Huntsville Stars players
Tacoma Tigers players
Rochester Aces players
Memphis Chicks players
Winnipeg Goldeyes players
Edmonton Trappers players
Fargo-Moorhead RedHawks players
Major League Baseball pitchers
Minnesota Twins players
Oakland Athletics scouts
Philadelphia Phillies players